OneMine is non-profit entity and searchable online global mining and minerals library.

History 
OneMine is a non-profit entity governed by a steering committee whose members are nominated and serve for a term of three calendar years. It was launched as a collaborative effort between professional societies in the mining and minerals related fields to promote access to technical articles, periodicals, books, and other published work as research source for engineers in related disciplines. OneMine is a searchable online global mining and minerals library. OneMine currently contains more than 117,000 articles, technical papers, and other documents from mining societies around the world. Professional societies and associations in the mining, metallurgical, and tunneling communities may have their technical papers, journals, periodicals, and other published works considered for inclusion in the OneMine library.

Contents 
OneMine contains over 130 years of peer reviewed works from professional societies including:
 AIME – The American Institute of Mining, Metallurgical, and Petroleum Engineers
 AusIMM – The Australasian Institute of Mining and Metallurgy
 CIM - The Canadian Institute of Mining, Metallurgy and Petroleum
 DFI – Deep Foundations Institute
 IMMS – International Marine Minerals Society
 IIMP - Instituto de Ingenieros de Minas del Peru
 NIOSH – National Institute for Occupational Safety and Health
 SAIMM – The Southern African Institute of Mining and Metallurgy
 SME – Society for Mining, Metallurgy, and Exploration
 TMS – The Minerals, Metals & Materials Society

Among the published works accessible in OneMine are:
 Mining Engineering Magazine peer reviewed technical papers
 SME Transactions – an annual publication of peer reviewed technical papers by the SME
 Tunneling and Underground Construction – a monthly periodical
 SME Annual Meeting Proceedings
 Technical papers by the AIME, AusIMM, CIM, DFI, IMMS, IIMP, NIOSH, SAIMM, SME and TMS.
 Proceedings from several years of International Mineral Processing Congress

References

Works about mining
Online databases